Sir Eubule John Waddington,  (9 April 1890 – 18 January 1957) was an English colonial administrator. He served as Governor of Barbados from 1938 to 1941, and Governor of Northern Rhodesia from to 1941 to 1947. After leaving the Colonial Service, he was Chairman of the International African Institute from 1949 until his death.

References

External links
 

1890 births
1957 deaths
Governors of Barbados
Governors of Northern Rhodesia
Knights Grand Cross of the Order of the British Empire
Knights Commander of the Order of St Michael and St George
Knights Commander of the Royal Victorian Order
Alumni of Merton College, Oxford